This list includes the awards and nominations received by screen and stage actor Al Pacino. Among his numerous competitive awards, he has won an Oscar, a BAFTA, two Emmys, two Tonys, and four Golden Globes. He was also nominated for a Grammy. His honorary awards include the Honorary Golden Lion at Venice Film Festival in 1994, the Golden Globe Cecil B. DeMille Award in 2001, the National Medal of Arts in 2011, and the Kennedy Center Honors in 2016.

Major awards

Academy Awards

BAFTA Awards

Directors Guild Awards

Primetime Emmy Awards

Golden Globe Awards

Grammy Awards

Screen Actors Guild Awards

Tony Awards

Other awards

American Comedy Awards

American Movie Awards

Blockbuster Entertainment Awards

Boston Society of Film Critics Awards

Chicago Film Critics Association Awards

Columbus Film Critics Association Awards

David di Donatello Awards

Drama Desk Awards

Hollywood Film Awards

Independent Spirit Awards

Kansas City Film Critics Circle Awards

Karlovy Vary International Film Festival

London Film Critics Circle Awards

Los Angeles Film Critics Association Awards

MTV Movie Awards

National Board of Review Awards

National Society of Film Critics Awards

New York Film Critics Circle Awards

Obie Awards

San Sebastián International Film Festival

Satellite Awards

Saturn Awards

Teen Choice Awards

Television Critics Association Awards

Theatre World Awards

Valladolid International Film Festival

Special awards

Other
This list includes awards, votes, etc. where Al Pacino appears by websites, channels or magazines.

References

Sources
 
 
 Other Works and stage award of Pacino in IMDb.com
 

Pacino, Al